Blackrock railway station serves Blackrock in Dún Laoghaire–Rathdown, Ireland.  It opened publicly on 17 December 1834 and is one of the three original stations on the Dublin and Kingstown Railway (D&KR), the oldest public passenger railway in Ireland.

Services 
The station has two through platforms connected via a footbridge with lifts.

DART 
From the inception of the Dublin Area Rapid Transit (DART) service in 1984, all DART services stop at Blackrock.

Other services 
Blackrock is on the intercity Dublin-Rosslare and commuter Dundalk-Dublin-Arklow-Gorey routes and some trains on these routes have a scheduled stop here.

History
The station opened on 17 December 1834. as one of the three original stations on the D&KR, the others being Westland Row (Pearse) and  though the latter was subsequently rebuilt to the south of the original site.  On 27 January 1858, a heavy accident happened in the vicinity of the station.

Road transport services 
Directly outside the station are bus stops served by several Dublin Bus routes, Go-Ahead Ireland routes and some private operators.

There is also a taxi rank near the station on Blackrock Main Street, and a large car park adjacent to the station.

Gallery

See also
 List of railway stations in Ireland

References

External links

 Irish Rail Blackrock Station Website

Iarnród Éireann stations in Dún Laoghaire–Rathdown
1834 establishments in Ireland
Railway stations in the Republic of Ireland opened in 1834